The Wytham Baronetcy, of Goldsborough in the County of York, was a title in the Baronetage of England.  It was created on 13 December 1683 for John Wytham. The title became extinct on his death in 1689.

Wytham baronets, of Goldsborough (1683)
Sir John Wytham, 1st Baronet (–1689)

References

Extinct baronetcies in the Baronetage of England